Football clubs in the Thai League 1 compete in the AFC Champions League annually. This details the participation and performances in the competition since its based at 2002 as a result of the merger between the Asian Club Championship, the Asian Cup Winners' Cup and the Asian Super Cup.

Participations
 Q: Qualifying Stage, GS: Group Stage, R16: Round of 16, QF: Quarterfinals, SF: Semifinals, RU: Runners-Up, W: Winners

1 PEA FC and TTM FC qualified for 2006 AFC Champions League group stage, but were later disqualified because of failing to fill in their player registration forms in time.
2 Club no longer exists.

Statistics by club

By Clubs

Bangkok United

Police Tero

Results

Chiangrai United

Chonburi

Krung Thai Bank

Results

Osotsapa

Results

Muangthong United

Buriram United

BG Pathum United

Sukhothai

Results

Port

See also 
 Thai clubs in the Asian Club Championship
 Thai clubs in the AFC Cup
 Thai football records and statistics
 Australian clubs in the AFC Champions League
 Chinese clubs in the AFC Champions League
 Indian football clubs in Asian competitions
 Indonesian football clubs in Asian competitions
 Iranian clubs in the AFC Champions League
 Iraqi clubs in the AFC Champions League
 Japanese clubs in the AFC Champions League
 Myanmar clubs in the AFC Champions League
 Qatari clubs in the AFC Champions League
 Saudi Arabian clubs in the AFC Champions League
 South Korean clubs in the AFC Champions League
 Vietnamese clubs in the AFC Champions League

 Champions League
Thai football clubs in international competitions
Football clubs in the AFC Champions League